Ophelia is a feminine given name, probably derived from Ancient Greek ὠφέλεια (ōphéleia, "benefit").

The name is best known as a character from William Shakespeare’s Hamlet who met a tragic end. More modern associations, including Ophelia, a song by The Lumineers, now also influence perceptions of the name, which also has a history of use dating back to the late 1800s.        Author Laura Wattenberg noted that the name is elegant, exotic, and similar in style to the popular name Olivia but has a more Gothic, romantic sensibility that some parents find appealing. Ophelia is also a moon of Uranus named after the Shakespearean character and the name of a variety of hybrid tea rose bred in 1912. Ophelia has also been the subject of numerous songs, paintings, film and television productions.

Usage
The name has ranked among the top 1,000 names for girls in the United States since 2015 and among the top 400 since 2018. It was the 321st most popular name for American girls born in 2021, when 1,006 girls were given the name.  

It has also increased in usage in England and Wales, where it was ranked among the top 500 names since 2009 and among the top 200 since 2018.

People with the given name
 Ophelia Benson, American author, editor, blogger, and feminist
 Ophelia Dahl (born 1964), British social justice and health care advocate
 Ophelia DeVore (1922-2014), American businesswoman, publisher, and model
 Ophelia Dimalanta (1932-2010), Filipino poet
 Ophelia Ford (born 1950), Tennessee politician
 Ophelia Gordon Bell (1915-1975), English sculptor 
 Ophélia Kolb, French actress
 Ophelia S. Lewis (born 1961), Liberian author
 Ophelia Lovibond (born 1986), English actress
 Ophelia Marie (born 1951), Dominican singer
 Ophelia Hoff Saytumah, Liberian politician

Fictional characters
 Ofelia, a character in Pan's Labyrinth
 Ophelia, a character in Claymore
 Ophelia, a character from APB: Reloaded
 Ophelia, a character from Brütal Legend
 Ophelia, a character from Romeo × Juliet
 Ophelia Frump, of the television series The Addams Family
 Ophelia Nigmos, a character appearing in The Sims 2
 Ophelia Ramírez, of the television series The Life and Times of Juniper Lee
 Ophelia St. Clare, of the novel Uncle Tom's Cabin
 Ofelia Salazar, fictional character in Fear the Walking Dead
 Ofelia Santoro, a character in the book Third and Indiana
 Ophelia Sarkissian, a Marvel Comics character and often foe of Captain America and the Avengers
 Ophelia, a character from William Shakespeare's Hamlet

Film and television
 Ophélia (1963 film)
 Ophelia (2018 film)
 "Ophelia", an episode of Ergo Proxy

Music
 Ophelia (album), an album by Natalie Merchant
 The Ophelias (California band), a San Francisco neo-psychedelic band of the late 1980s
 The Ophelias (Ohio band), an American rock band
Ophelia Records, a record label by American musician Seven Lions

Songs
 "Ophelia" (The Band song)
 "Ophelia" (The Lumineers song) (2016)
 "Ophelia", a song by Tori Amos from Abnormally Attracted to Sin
 "Ophelia", a song by L'Arc-en-Ciel from Awake
 "Ophelia", a song by Dawnstar
 "Ophelia", a song by Peter Hammill from Sitting Targets
 "Ophelia", a song by Kashmir from No Balance Palace
 "Ophelia", a song by Kaya
 "Ophelia", a song by Nikola Šarčević from Freedom to Roam
 "Ophelia", a song by Kula Shaker from Pilgrims Progress
 "Ophelia", a song by Tear Garden from Tired Eyes Slowly Burning
 "Ophelia", a song by Natalie Merchant from Ophelia

Paintings
 Ophelia (painting), an 1852 painting by John Everett Millais
 Ophelia, an 1883 painting by Alexandre Cabanel
 Ophelia, an 1870 painting by Pierre Auguste Cot
 Ophelia, a painting by Arthur Hughes
 Ophelia, an 1895 painting by Paul Albert Steck
 Ophelia, any of several paintings by John William Waterhouse

Places
 Ophelia, Virginia
 Ophelia (moon), a moon of Uranus
 171 Ophelia, an asteroid

Ships
German hospital ship Ophelia, a German hospital ship completed in 1912
 HMS Ophelia, a Royal Navy M-class destroyer launched in 1915

Notes